This page details the process of qualifying for the 1974 African Cup of Nations which was held in Egypt in March 1974. Eight teams qualified for the finals, including Egypt as hosts and Congo as the holders of the title, having won the 1972 tournament in Cameroon.

Qualification followed a knock-out model, with teams playing two-legged ties with another, one match being played at a home venue for each team. After a preliminary round, 24 teams competed in the first round of qualification. The winners went on to the second round with the winning teams from those ties qualifying for the finals. Matches were held between March and July 1973. A number of teams withdrew at the preliminary or first round stages of the tournament with their scheduled opponents automatically progressing to the next round. After winning their first round match the Central African Republic were disqualified and their opponents, Ivory Coast progressed to the second round, eventually reaching the finals.

Alongside Ivory Coast, Guinea, Mauritius, Uganda, Zaire and Zambia reached the finals, Uganda having taken part in the preliminary round of the qualification process.

Qualifying Tournament

Preliminary round

|}

Uganda won 5–2 on aggregate.

Central African Republic progress, Gabon withdrew.

Sierra Leone progress, Dahomey withdrew.

First round

|}

Mali won 5–3 on aggregate.

Ghana won 5–3 on penalties after 3–3 on aggregate.

Ivory Coast won 6–5 on aggregate.

Tanzania won 4–2 on aggregate.

Mauritius won 5–1 on aggregate.

Nigeria won 3–2 on aggregate.

Zaire won 9–1 on aggregate.

Uganda won 3–1 on aggregate.

Zambia won 4–3 on aggregate.

Algeria progress, Libya withdrew.

Cameroon progress, Niger withdrew.

Guinea progress, Togo withdrew.

Second round

|}

Zaire won 3–2 on aggregate.

Guinea won 7–6 on penalties after 3–3 on aggregate.

Uganda won 3–2 on aggregate.

Mauritius won 4–3 on penalties after 1–1 on aggregate.

Ivory Coast won 4–0 on aggregate.

Zambia won 7–4 on aggregate.

Qualified teams
The 8 qualified teams are:

Notes

External links
CAN 1974 details - rsssf.com

Africa Cup of Nations qualification
Qualification
Qual